Syzygium malaccense is a species of flowering tree native to tropical Asia and Australia. It is one of the species cultivated since prehistoric times by the Austronesian peoples. They were carried and introduced deliberately to Remote Oceania as canoe plants. In modern times, it has been introduced throughout the tropics, including many Caribbean countries and territories.

Names
Syzygium malaccense has a number of English common names. It is known as a Malay rose apple, or simply Malay apple, mountain apple, rose apple, Otaheite apple, pink satin-ash, plumrose and pommerac (derived from pomme Malac, meaning "Malayan apple" in French). Despite the fact that it is sometimes called the Otaheite cashew, it is not related to cashew. While cashew nuts (but not cashew fruits) may trigger allergic reactions, rose apple fruit has not been observed to do so.
In Costa Rica is known as Manzana de Agua. It is found mainly in the rainy zones on the Atlantic Coast of the country. In Colombia, Puerto Rico, and other Latin American countries is also found and known as Poma Rosa.

Description
The combination of tree, flowers and fruit has been praised as the most beautiful of the genus Syzygium. The fruit is oblong-shaped and dark red in color, although some varieties have white or pink skins. The flesh is white and surrounds a large seed. Its taste is bland but refreshing. Jam is prepared by stewing the flesh with brown sugar and ginger.

Cultivation
Malay apple is a strictly tropical tree and will be damaged by freezing temperatures. It flowers in early summer, bearing fruit three months afterward. In Costa Rica, it flowers earlier, with ripe fruit in April. Coffee growers use the species to both divert birds and provide shade.

In Hawaii, Syzygium malaccense is called mountain apple or 'Ōhi'a 'ai. When the Polynesians reached the Hawaiian Islands, they brought plants and animals that were important to them. The mountain apple was one of these "canoe plants," arriving 1000–1700 years ago.

Nutrition 
The mountain apple is an edible fruit that can be consumed when raw and ripe. In Puerto Rico, the Malay apple is used to make wines, in Hawai'i, the fruits are consumed the same way a Pacific Northwest apple is eaten. Indonesians consume the flowers of the tree in salads and in Guyana the skin of the mountain apple is cooked down to make a syrup. A mountain apple has a white fleshy fruit that has a similar texture to a pear but less sweet than an apple. Below is a chart with more nutrition information derived from Malay apples found in Hawai'i, El Salvador, and Ghana. Due to the high water content, the Mountain Apple is lower in calories than a Gala apple or a Fuji apple and contains a moderate amount of vitamins and minerals.

History
In 1793, Captain William Bligh was commissioned to procure edible fruits from the Pacific Islands for Jamaica, including this species.

Gallery

See also
Domesticated plants and animals of Austronesia

References

 

malaccense
Trees of Australia
Trees of Malesia
Trees of Papuasia
Plants described in 1753
Taxa named by Carl Linnaeus
Fruit trees